Pine Creek Wilderness is a wilderness area designated by Congress in 1984. It is located entirely in California, and managed by United States Forest Service as part of the Cleveland National Forest.

It is situated entirely in California, bordered by the Hauser Wilderness to the south. Vegetation consists primarily of chaparral (dominated by chamise and scrub oak) with oak woodland along stream bottoms.

Wilderness permits are required for both day and overnight use.

References

External links

 Pine Creek Wilderness

Wilderness areas of California